Macabebe, officially the Municipality of Macabebe, is a 1st class municipality in the province of Pampanga, Philippines. According to the 2020 census, it has a population of 78,151 people.

History 
Macabebe, an ancient town in the modern-day province of Pampanga, is intimately linked to the Pampanga River (Río Grande de la Pampanga). The town was named Macabebe because it is geographically situated along the shores (Pampangan: bebe; Tagalog: baybay) or banks of Río Grande de Pampanga. The town is sometimes referred to as Makabibe because of the abundance of corals and shells along the Río Grande in earlier times. The Macabebes were the first Kapampangans to appear in European recorded history. In the Spanish Colonial period of the Philippines, Macabebe was considered one of the oldest and most important communities of Pampanga.

The ancient town of Macabebe owes its importance to its location along the Rio Grande de la Pampanga (Pampanga River). The river's routes and its northern tributaries provided the pathways to the early major settlements in Pampanga. The English translation of Macabebe, meaning:  'surrounded by rivers'  describes the historical heritage of the ancient town.

The Macabebe dialect is said to be harsher and louder than others due to how the townspeople communicate across the river.

The Pampanga River is of great importance to Macabebe. Fishing is still a major source of sustenance and income for its residents. A number of fisheries can be found along the river.

The province of Pampanga is also the traditional homeland of the Kapampangan people. The Kapampangan of Macabebe had played a dynamic and at times conflicting role in the history of the Philippines. They fought against the Spanish in 1571, such as the case when the youthful Tarik Soliman (Bambalito) became the first Kapampangan and Filipino martyr who fought against Spanish rule. They also defended the last Spanish garrison against revolutionaries in 1898. The services of the Macabebes led to the naming of a street in Spain's capital city of Madrid in their honor, "Calle de Voluntarios Macabebes."

The Kapampangans of Macabebe were also allies of imperial Spain when the Dutch invaders tried to colonize the Philippines. They fought together with the Spaniards to protect the islands from its invaders, and in return only the Kapampangan are allowed to study in prominent exclusive schools and universities ran by the Spaniards.

In 1901, American General Frederick Funston and his troops captured Philippine President Emilio Aguinaldo in Palanan, Isabela, with the help of some Kapampangans (later called the Macabebe Scouts after their home locale) who had joined the Americans' side. The Americans pretended to be captives of the Macabebes, who were dressed in Philippine Army uniforms. Once Funston and his "captors" entered Aguinaldo's camp, they immediately apprehended Aguinaldo and his men.

During World War II, Japanese fighter and bomber planes air raided the municipalities of Macabebe in December 1941. Macabebe was subsequently occupied by the Japanese Imperial Army in 1942.

Geography
Macabebe is located in the southern part of Pampanga. It is bordered to the north by the municipalities of Minalin, Guagua and Apalit; to the east by the municipalities of Calumpit and Hagonoy in Bulacan; to the west by the municipality of Sasmuan; and to the south by the municipality of Masantol and Manila Bay.

Barangays
Macabebe is politically subdivided into 26 barangays.

Climate

Demographics

Religion

Roman Catholicism is the town inhabitants' main religion.  The town's population is composed of the following: Catholics 87%, Members Church of God International 5%, Iglesia ni Cristo 3%, Evangelicals 2%, others 3%.

Churches
The Roman Catholic Archdiocese of San Fernando has jurisdiction over the San Nicolas de Tolentino Parish Church. It was founded in 1575 under the advocation of San Nicolas de Tolentino. The facade of the church has scant ornamentation and its architectural symmetry is lost amid the various forms assumed windows, and the main entrance. Simple neo-classic lines of the facade.

Macabebe is also home to San Gabriel Chapel. This newly erected chapel is a replacement of the old chapel that has been devastated by the flooding after the Mt. Pinatubo eruption. It was then formally constructed in 2002 and came into completion and inaugurated in May 2010.

Another important church in the town is the Presentation of the Lord Parish in barangay Batasan.  The chapel has been built over a century ago and was elevated to a parish church in 1995. Its first "cura parroco" was Father Gabriel Torres.

One of the most visited churches in Macabebe is the Sta Maria Chapel, the home of the barangay's Queen and Patroness (NUESTRA SENIORA DELA PAZ). The chapel is under the jurisdiction of San Rafael Archangel Parish Church. The newly erected chapel is a replacement of the old chapel because the old one has always been flooded during the rainy season. After the completion of its renovation, it was inaugurated in April 2005, and blessed by Archbishop Paciano Aniceto, DD. The place where the church is erected was called "baliti". The name was attributed to the fact that prior to the arrival of the Spaniards in Macabebe, at that exact place, it was believed that a big balete tree was planted.

Economy

Government

Like other towns in the Philippines, Macabebe is governed by a mayor and vice mayor who are elected for three-year terms. The mayor is the executive head and leads the town's departments in executing the ordinances and improving public services. The vice mayor heads a legislative council (Sangguniang Bayan) consisting of councilors from the barangays of barrios. The District Office of the Congressional representative stands near the town centre.

Tourism and culture
The town is rich in its past and treasures. Its town hall and churches reveal the wealth of the town's heritage.

Town Fiesta
The town's fiesta is held annually on 10 September in honor of San Nicolas de Tolentino, the town's patron saint. Group 10

Barangay Fiestas
Barangay Santa Maria. (Nuestra Señora dela Paz) or locally known as "Apung Maria" has the largest area among all other barangays in Macabebe. The image of the Virgin is the most venerated Marian image in the town and in the province of Pampanga. Every fiesta eve, they bring the original image to "Taldawa" or bukid (which is now under the place of Masantol & Minalin) for a house to house blessing within the whole day by means of "limbun", a Capampangan term for Libot or Umiikot. Only Apung Maria can do that wonderful event all over the province because she's connecting and making the way again in the place that Macabebe owns before. The feast day is every last Saturday and Sunday of the month of April, and holds one of the most grandiose festivity in the whole town of Macabebe. Devotees from abroad and Manila and locals of Pampanga come together to give honor and celebrate her festivity. During her festivity, they gather around to the original image for a grand procession (afternoon and evening) in tuned of Batalya, as she is known as LA REINA DE BATALYA, in honor of St. Mary, Mother of Jesus.
Barangay San Jose celebrates fiesta on the 3rd Sunday of March in honor of St. Joseph.
 Barangay Saplad David celebrates fiesta on 9 January in honor of the Black Nazarene.
Barangay Santo Rosario celebrates fiesta on 1 May in honor of the Our Lady of the Most Holy Rosary.
Barangay San Rafael celebrates fiesta on 24 October in honor of St. Raphael the Archangel
Barangay San Juan celebrates fiesta on 24 June in honor of St. John the Baptist, people splash water to each other.
Barangay San Gabriel and Barangay Caduang Tete celebrates fiesta on the 2nd Sunday of May and 29 September in honor of St. Gabriel the Archangel.
Barangay San Isidro celebrates fiesta on 15 May in honor of St. Isidore the Farmer.
Barangay Santo Niño celebrates fiesta twice a year one is on the 3rd Sunday of January and the other on the 3rd Sunday of April in honor of the Santo Niño.
Barangay Batasan celebrates its fiesta on 2 February in honor of Nuestra Señora de Candelaria and the "Presentation of the Lord Parish".
Barangay Santa Rita celebrates fiesta on 22 May in honor of St. Rita.
Barangay San Roque celebrates fiesta on the 1st Sunday of May in honor of Saint Roch but the Western celebrates his death on 16 August (13).
Barangay Santa Lutgarda celebrates fiesta on the 1st Sunday of May and on 16 June in honor of the birth of their patron Apung Santa Lutgarda.
Barangay San Vicente celebrates fiesta on the 1st Sunday of April in honor of St. Vincent.
Barangay San Francisco celebrates fiesta on the last Sunday of April and on 4 October in honor of St. Francis of Assisi.
 Barangay Castuli celebrates their fiesta on the last Saturday of February in honor of Our Lady of Lourdes.
 Barangay Mataguiti celebrates their fiesta on the 1st Sunday of May and known for having a "libad" or boat procession in honoring the Lord Jesus Christ cross as their patron.
Barangay Candelaria celebrates fiesta on 2 February and known for having a "libad" or boat procession in honoring the Nuestra Señora de Candelaria.
 Barangay San Esteban celebrates their fiesta on the 4th Sunday of April in honor of St. Stephen.
 Barangay Santa Cruz celebrates their fiesta on 3 May.
 Barangay Tacasan celebrates fiesta on 19 March in honor of Señor San José.
 Barangay Telacsan celebrates their fiesta on 15 May and 31 December (the last day of the year) to give thanks to St. Isidore, their patron saint, for all the blessings that they have received for the whole year.

Healthcare

The town provides medical missions and free medical operations, including fully functional health facilities serves in every barangay. There are few hospitals in the town.

The town's health care needs is provided by the Mayor Domingo B. Flores Memorial District Hospital located in Barangay Batasan.

Notable personalities
Jay Sonza, Filipino journalist and politician
"The Youth Leader of Macabebe" – Also known as "Tarik Soliman" and "Bambalito"; rebel who fought the Spaniards in the Battle of Bangkusay
Vicente Manansala, National Artist for Painting (1981)
Mark Macapagal, Filipino former basketball player
Remy Martin, Filipino-American basketball player

References

External links

 Macabebe Profile at PhilAtlas.com
 [ Philippine Standard Geographic Code]
Philippine Census Information
Local Governance Performance Management System

Municipalities of Pampanga
Populated places on Manila Bay
Populated places on the Pampanga River